São Judas is a station on Line 1 (Blue) of the São Paulo Metro. It will be integrated with the planned Line 20 (Pink).

SPTrans lines
The following SPTrans bus lines can be accessed. Passengers may use a Bilhete Único card for transfer:

References

São Paulo Metro stations
Railway stations opened in 1974
1974 establishments in Brazil
Railway stations located underground in Brazil